Cato Zahl Pedersen (born 12 January 1959) is a Norwegian skier and multiple Paralympic gold medal winner. He has won a total of fourteen medals (thirteen gold, one silver) at the Paralympic Games, in both Winter and Summer Paralympics. He has no arms, having lost both in a childhood accident.

He competed in track and field athletics at the 1980 and 1984 Summer Paralympics, winning six gold medals. He took part in the Summer Games again in 2000, this time in sailing, but did not medal. At the Winter Paralympics, he competed in alpine skiing four times, in 1980, 1984, 1988 and 1994. At the 1980 and 1984 Winter Games he also took part in cross-country skiing, winning one gold in 1980.

Pedersen took the athletes' oath on behalf of all competitors at the 1994 Winter Paralympics in Lillehammer.

In 1994/1995, Pedersen took part in a successful four-person Norwegian skiing expedition to the South Pole. He dragged his 200-pound sledge the whole distance, using the prosthetic hook on his right hand to hold a single ski pole. He has also climbed Cho Oyu, the 7th highest mountain, in 2005, and almost reached the top of Mount Everest in 2007.

References

External links
 

1959 births
Living people
Norwegian amputees
Norwegian male alpine skiers
Norwegian male cross-country skiers
Paralympic athletes of Norway
Athletes (track and field) at the 1980 Summer Paralympics
Athletes (track and field) at the 1984 Summer Paralympics
Paralympic sailors of Norway
Norwegian male sailors (sport)
Sailors at the 2000 Summer Paralympics
Paralympic alpine skiers of Norway
Alpine skiers at the 1980 Winter Paralympics
Alpine skiers at the 1984 Winter Paralympics
Alpine skiers at the 1988 Winter Paralympics
Alpine skiers at the 1994 Winter Paralympics
Paralympic cross-country skiers of Norway
Cross-country skiers at the 1980 Winter Paralympics
Cross-country skiers at the 1984 Winter Paralympics
Paralympic gold medalists for Norway
Paralympic silver medalists for Norway
Norwegian disability rights activists
Medalists at the 1980 Winter Paralympics
Medalists at the 1988 Winter Paralympics
Medalists at the 1994 Winter Paralympics
Paralympic medalists in athletics (track and field)
Paralympic medalists in cross-country skiing
20th-century Norwegian people